Love Forever Shines is the eighth studio album by American singer Regina Belle. It was released by Pendulum Records on May 13, 2008 in the United States. The album became Belle's highest-charting album since Reachin' Back (1995), peaking at number three on the US Top Gospel Albums and number 15 on the Top R&B/Hip-Hop Albums. The album's first single "God Is Good" peaked at number 34 on the Hot R&B/Hip-Hop Songs.

Critical reception

Allmusic editor Tammy La Gorce found that Love Forever Shines "proves it's never too late to return to the sound that gave you liftoff [...] Belle busts out a spiritual certainty that benefits from maturity. She's an artist who's been there, seen that, and she's saved some of her boldest, most bewitching moments [...] for this record. Jazz, hip-hop, R&B and soul make appearances, but at the end of a long set of praising, cherishing and reaching for the vocal rafters this is a pure contemporary gospel project. Fans of the genre will wish she had abandoned her days of Peabo Bryson and Johnny Mathis duets for a walk down this path decades ago."

Track listing

Charts

References

Regina Belle albums
2008 albums
Pendulum Records albums